pc Quest is the 1991 self-titled first album by the group pc Quest.  The album contains two Billboard Hot 100 hit singles ("After the Summer's Gone"(#41) and "Can I Call You My Girl"(#58)).  Most of the songs were written by one or both of the songwriting team Tim James and Steven McClintock (best known for their work with 1980s pop singer Tiffany).

Track listing
"After The Summer's Gone" - 4:04  (Tim James, Mike Piccirillo)
"Don't Be Afraid" - 3:53 (Steven McClintock, Tim James, John Duarte)
"Can I Call You My Girl?" - 3:56 (Steven McClintock, Tim James, John Duarte, Monty Brinkley)
"Show Me" - 3:33 (Mike Piccirillo, Tim James)
"The Hardest Part (Is Being Young)" - 4:07 (Steven McClintock, Tim James, John Duarte)
"I'm Still Cold" - 3:46 (Tim James, Eric Winer, Mike Piccirillo)
"Just Forget About 'Em" - 5:07 (Monty Brinkley)
"Can't You See?" - 3:53 (Steven McClintock, Tim James, John Duarte, Monty Brinkley)
"Loverboy" - 3:14 (Drew Nichols, Steve Petree, Mike Piccirillo)
"Ready, Aim, Dance!" - 4:04 (Steven McClintock, Tim James, John Duarte)

Singles
"Can I Call You My Girl" (RCA 62018) - Debuted on the Billboard Hot 100 on May 4, 1991.  Top 50 CHR.  #58 Hot 100.
"After the Summer's Gone" (Geffen/Warner Bros 19656 and RCA 62051 & RDAB62075)- Debuted on the Billboard Hot 100 August 17, 1991. Top 40 CHR and Top 40 R&B. #41 Hot 100.  Single #RDAB62075 contained four different mixes of the song.

Members
Chad Petree
Stephen Petree
Drew Nichols
Kim Whipkey

External links and references
[ Album info on Allmusic]
Chart information on McJames music website
Information on Discogs about pc Quest's self titled debut including Credits

1991 debut albums